Malta competed in the Junior Eurovision Song Contest 2022, which was held on 11 December 2022 in Yerevan, Armenia. Maltese broadcaster Public Broadcasting Services (PBS) was responsible for the country's participation in the contest, and organised a national final to select the Maltese entry.

Background 

Prior to the  contest, Malta had participated in the Junior Eurovision Song Contest sixteen times since their first participation in the inaugural . In the  contest, Malta was represented by the song "My Home" performed by Ike and Kaya. The song placed 12th out of 19 entries with 97 points.

Before Junior Eurovision

Malta Junior Eurovision Song Contest 2022 
Malta's participation in the contest was confirmed by PBS in June 2022. PBS organised the national final Malta Junior Eurovision Song Contest 2022 to select the Maltese entry.

Competing entries 
Artists were able to submit their entries between 24 June 2022 and 15 August 2022. For the preliminary selection, PBS nominated a professional jury, which judged the studio versions of all submissions. While applicants can submit more than one song, only one submission per lead artist can make the final participant list, unlike the previous edition. The final list of participants was revealed on 1 September 2022.

Final 
The final took place on 2 October 2022 at the Rediffusion House in Gwardamanġa, hosted by Ryan and Josmar . The winner was selected by the votes of a jury panel (75%) and public televoting (25%). The jury consisted of singer Mary Rose Mallia, Maltese Eurovision Song Contest 1997 entrant Debbie Scerri, Maltese Eurovision Song Contest 2004 entrant Ludwig Galea and presenter Roderick Azzopardi Custo. The interval act featured performances by former Maltese Junior Eurovision entrants Eliana Gomez Blanco, Gianluca Cilia, and Ike and Kaya. "Diamonds in the Skies" performed by Gaia Gambuzza was announced as the winner of the national final.

At Junior Eurovision 
After the opening ceremony, which took place on 5 December 2022, it was announced that Malta would perform fourth on 11 December 2022, following Kazakhstan and preceding Italy.

Voting

Detailed voting results

References 

Malta
2022
Junior Eurovision Song Contest